Ghostbusters: Afterlife (Original Motion Picture Soundtrack) is the soundtrack album for the film of the same name, released by Sony Classical Records on November 19, 2021. The film score includes new material composed by Rob Simonsen, as well as utilizing material originally written by Elmer Bernstein for the original film.

Development
Simonsen was confirmed to be scoring Ghostbusters: Afterlife, after doing so for Jason Reitman for Tully and The Front Runner. For Ghostbusters: Afterlife, Simonsen studied Elmer Bernstein's score from the original Ghostbusters. He approached Peter Bernstein to take on the role of score consultant, and Bernstein provided guidance on the orchestration of Simonsen's score, as well as the use of the material from Ghostbusters. Simonsen made use of the ondes Martenot throughout the score, played by Cynthia Millar, who also played the same instrument on Elmer Bernstein's 1984 Ghostbusters score.

Track listing

Personnel
 Rob Simonsen - composer
 Curt Sobel - album producer, music editor
 Anthony Parnther - conductor
 Peter Bernstein - score consultant
 Mark Graham - orchestration
 William Ross - additional orchestration and conducting

See also
Ghostbusters (1984 soundtrack)
Ghostbusters II (soundtrack)
Ghostbusters (2016 soundtrack)

References

Ghostbusters music
2021 soundtrack albums
Rob Simonsen soundtracks
Sony Classical Records soundtracks
Comedy film soundtracks